Caplothorax is a genus of sap beetles.

Species
There are 11 species in the genus Caplothorax:
 Caplothorax brevipennis  
 Caplothorax californicus 
 Caplothorax funebris 
 Caplothorax lugubris 
 Caplothorax melanopterus 
 Caplothorax rufiventris 
 Caplothorax rufus 
 Caplothorax sayi 
 Caplothorax similaris 
 Caplothorax viduatus 
 Caplothorax yuccae

References

Nitidulidae
Beetle genera